Bassani Racing is a Brazilian auto racing team based in São Paulo.

External links
  

Stock Car Brasil teams
Auto racing teams established in 2002
Brazilian auto racing teams
Formula Renault teams